Shahriar (also Romanized as Shahrīār and Shahryār) is a village in Falard Rural District of Falard District, Lordegan County, Chaharmahal and Bakhtiari province, Iran. At the 2006 census, its population was 2,123 in 438 households. The following census in 2011 counted 2,211 people in 563 households. The latest census in 2016 showed a population of 2,076 people in 614 households; it was the largest village in its rural district.

References 

Lordegan County

Populated places in Chaharmahal and Bakhtiari Province

Populated places in Lordegan County